Dream, Tiresias! is a 2009 album by the German Electro-industrial act Project Pitchfork. It is their 11th studio album and was released  in multiple formats, including a double-disc limited version. The song "Feel!" was released as a single to promote the album.

Track listing

"If I Could" – 5:53 
"Nasty Habit" – 5:49
"The Tide" – 5:54
"Promises" – 6:16
"An End" – 5:21
"Your God" – 5:32
"Feel!" – 6:46
"Full Of Life" – 5:38
"Darkness" – 5:31
"Passion" – 7:52
"Feel! ([:SITD:] Remix)"* – 4:36
"Feel! (Remixed By Noisuf-X)"* – 5:35
"Feel! (Die Krupps Remix)"* – 5:57
* = Bonus track on Trisol editions of the album

Limited Edition Bonus Disc
"Despise" – 3:54
"One Million Faces" (RMX) – 7:30
"Last Dream" – 4:38

Trivia
 Each song on the main disc, excluding the bonus tracks, is followed by a short interlude referred to in the liner notes as "dreams"
 "One Million Faces (RMX)" is a remix of a song off their "Wonderland/One Million Faces" EP

References

2009 albums
Project Pitchfork albums